Technological sovereignty is a political outlook where information and communications infrastructure and technology is aligned to the laws, needs and interests of the country in which users are located; data sovereignty or information sovereignty sometimes overlaps with technological sovereignty, since their distinctions are not clear, and also refer to subjective information about the laws of the country in which the data subject is a citizen, or the information is stored or flows through, whatever its form, including when it has been converted and stored in binary digital form.

Following revelations by Edward Snowden about the activities of the United States' National Security Agency, and their PRISM surveillance programme, rising concerns about misuse of data led to various proposals to enable citizens and consumers outside of the US to enjoy protection through technological sovereignty.

See also
 Network sovereignty
 Data governance
 Data localization
 Digital self-determination
 Information privacy (data protection)
 Legal aspects of computing
 Privacy

References

Political ideologies
Data laws